Rockcliffe Park (French: Parc Rockcliffe)  is a neighbourhood in Rideau-Rockcliffe Ward, close to the centre of Ottawa, Ontario, Canada. Established in 1864, organized as a Police village in 1908, and an independent village from 1926, and ultimately amalgamated with the rest of Ottawa on January 1, 2001. , it had a population of 2,021.  In 1977 the entire village of Rockcliffe Park was designated a Heritage Conservation District.  Rockcliffe Park is one of only a handful of surviving nineteenth-century communities of its kind in North America.

Geography
The area is northeast of downtown, on the southern banks of the Ottawa River. It encompasses the small McKay Lake (a Meromictic lake), Sand Pits Lake (The Pond), and the Rockeries, a rock garden and playing field maintained by the National Capital Commission (NCC).

As it was long a separate village not under the jurisdiction of Ottawa's municipal government, Rockcliffe Park differs from the rest of the city. The village is characterized by its park-like setting, with varied topography – narrow curving roads without curbs or sidewalks, many trees, generous lots and gardens, and houses set unobtrusively within a visually continuous, rich green landscape. It is relatively inaccessible to through traffic.

To the north, on the cliffs of the Ottawa River, there is public greenspace  maintained by the National Capital Commission, also called Rockcliffe Park. It is transversed by a branch of the Sir George-Étienne Cartier Parkway. The parkway has several small parking lots along its length that enable visitors to enjoy the lawns, wooded areas, parks, and lookouts. There is also a large gazebo, and public restrooms. In the winter visitors can enjoy cross-country skiing and toboganning. The largely francophone neighbourhood of Vanier lies to the south.

Heritage
Rockcliffe Park was founded by Thomas Keefer, in 1864, in accordance with the principles of the Picturesque tradition. The preservation of the natural landscape with roads lined with mature trees and curving around a varied topography, its rocky outcroppings and its lake and pond, as well as strong landscaping of individual properties, are all key to the Picturesque quality of the Village. The motto on the village coat-of-arms is “Inter Arboribus Floremus” - amidst the trees we flourish.

The entire village is a Heritage Conservation District. Heritage conservation district plans have been required for all heritage conservation districts in the province since 2005. After public consultations, and review by the City of Ottawa's Built Heritage Subcommittee and Planning Committee, the Rockcliffe Park Heritage Conservation District Plan was approved by Ottawa City Council in 2016. Legislation was enacted to adopt the Plan, pursuant to Section 41 of the Ontario Heritage Act. The Plan's objective is conservation of the park-like qualities of the area, and of the buildings and properties that contribute to its heritage character.

Since a heritage permit is now required prior to undertaking the alteration or demolition of a property, some property owners have raised concerns that market values will be negatively affected – see Ontario Heritage Act: Implementation and Issues. This heritage designation of properties was challenged in a landmark case of 270 Buchan Rd; in May 2019 the Local Planning Appeal Tribunal sided with the homeowner ordering that city to issue permit for demolition. The heritage consultant found incomplete evaluation forms and observations that don’t align with scores in a sample of 50 evaluations. The downfall of the city’s case to protect the home was an admission that 721 property evaluations in Rockcliffe Park were not done correctly and that more errors could be uncovered in the future. In the case of Statler v. Ottawa (City), 2017 CarswellOnt 18749 (O.M.B), the Ontario Municipal Board ("OMB") made the decision that Heritage Conservation District studies adopted prior to the 2005 amendments to the OHA have no force in law; and, that the pre-2005 OHA did not control property, only structures, resulting in the lack of legal authority to regulate land. "The decision of the OMB in Statler v. Ottawa (City) represents a warning to cities across the province that the Board (now the Local Planning Appeal Tribunal) will not allow municipalities to overreach their powers under the Ontario Heritage Act ("OHA")."

Community
The community is home to one public elementary school, Rockcliffe Park Public School (RPPS), and two private schools, Elmwood School and Ashbury College. Located beside the elementary school is a community hall/library complex. The library was originally funded, built and staffed through the efforts of Rockcliffe residents, but is now a branch of the Ottawa Public Library, with computer access, a charming children's area, a young adult section and regular adult section. The library houses a special collection of art-related books called the Margaret A. Bailey collection.

In the community hall there are memorabilia about and from HMCS Rockcliffe – an Algerine Class minesweeper – that served during the Second World War, and also a plaque and honour roll dedicated to residents who served.

There is no commercial activity in the village.

Rockcliffe Park is and has been home to many Ottawa notables, including former prime ministers, senior civil servants, corporate leaders and many ambassadors to Canada. The Dutch Royal Family lived here during the Second World War. Their former home, Stornoway, is now the residence of the leader of the Canadian Official Opposition. Rockcliffe Park Public School, which was attended by the eldest princess, Beatrix, now calls its gymnasium Queen Juliana Hall.

Demographics
According to the Canada 2016 Census:
Population: 1,932
% Change (2011–2016): −4.4
Dwellings: 785
Area (km².): 1.76
Density (persons per km².): 1094.7

Average salary in Rockcliffe Park is $119,377, whereas the average salary in Ottawa is $53,250.

The benchmark price for a single family home in Rockcliffe Park was $1,516,300 in August 2017, compared to $398,400 for the city of Ottawa as a whole.

Reeves and Mayors
The leading politician of Rockcliffe Park was known as the Reeve until the 1980s when that position was redesignated as Mayor.

 1926–1928: David L. McKeand
 1928–1932: R. E. Wodehouse
 1933–1938: C. P. Edwards
 1938–1954: D. P. Cruikshank
 1954–1956: James Hyndman
 1956–1965: Denis Coolican
 1965–1974: Alan O. Gibbons
 1974–1978: Ronald Clark
 1978–1985: Beryl Plumptre
 1985–2000: Patrick Murray

See also

 List of Ottawa neighbourhoods
 Rideau Hall
 Ottawa/Rockcliffe Airport
 Rockcliffe Flying Club

References

  , accessed 20 January 2007

External links

Neighbourhoods in Ottawa
Former municipalities now in Ottawa
Former villages in Ontario
Populated places disestablished in 2000